77th "Pirooz-e Samen-ol-A'emeh" Infantry Division of Khorasan is an infantry  division of the Ground Forces of Islamic Republic of Iran Army based in Mashhad, Razavi Khorasan Province. It was formerly being called 77th Infantry Division of Khorasan and was renamed to "The Victor of Samen-ol-A'emeh" ( Pirooz-e Samen-ol-A'emeh) later after the successful Operation Samen-ol-A'emeh during Iran–Iraq War, which was led by this division.

It was active during the Imperial Iranian regime during the 1970s. During the Iran–Iraq War the division fought in the Operation Fath ol-Mobin (March 1982), Operation Ramadan (July 1982), Operation Badr (March 1985), and Operation Karbala-6 in early 1987. One of the most famous episodes of the unit, came on May 9, 1982, when 6000 troops of this division were transported from Mashhad to Khuzestan in a single night. This was possible as a result of using the Boeing 747 Iran possessed as a  military transport aircraft, setting a new world record in the air transport history.

See also 
 Hossein Lashkari, a pilot member in "77-Khorasan Division"

References 

Infantry divisions of Ground Forces of Islamic Republic of Iran Army
Mashhad